Serious Thing is a roots reggae album released in 1984 by the reggae trio The Gladiators.

Track listing 
 "Serious Thing"
 "My Thoughts"
 "My Thoughts Version"
 "Fling it Gimme"
 "Rearrange"
 "Mid-Range"
 "Mid-Range Version"
 "Freedom Train"
 "Good Foundation"
 "After You"

Personnel 
 Albert Griffiths - Vocals, Rhythm guitar
 Clinton Fearon - Background vocals, Bass guitar
 Gallimore Sutherland - Background vocals, Rhythm guitar
 Clinton Rufus - Solo guitar
 Audley Taylor - Keyboard
 Stanley "Barnabas" Bryan - Drums
 Richard Ace - Keyboard
 Scully - Percussion 
 Bobby Ellis - Trumpet
 Deadly Headley - Saxophone
 Dean Fraser - Saxophone
 Ronald "Nambo" Robinson - Trombone
 David Madden - Trumpet
 Glen DaCosta - Saxophone
 Andy Bassford - Guitar

1984 albums
The Gladiators (band) albums